The Defense Nuclear Weapons School (DNWS) is housed on Kirtland Air Force Base in Albuquerque, New Mexico, and is administered by the Combat Support Directorate of the Defense Threat Reduction Agency. The school teaches courses on Consequence Assessment, Hazard Prediction, Ordnance Disposal, and other WMD-related coursework.

Mission 
DNWS is tasked with the mission of providing nuclear weapons core competencies and chemical, biological, radiological, nuclear, and high explosive (CBRNE) response training to DoD, other Federal and State Agencies, and National Laboratory personnel.

Vision 
The vision of the Defense Nuclear Weapons School is to be a premiere DoD military multi-Service/Joint CBRNE training facility.

Training Objectives 

The primary objective of the Defense Nuclear Weapons School is to create, develop, and implement professional training through alternative and innovative training technologies, ensuring the United States maintains safe, reliable, and credible nuclear deterrence. The DNWS provides the warfighter with topical information relating to United States nuclear core competency training, radiological/nuclear response training, and CBRNE/homeland defense training.

Military academies of the United States